A tava(h) / tawa(h) (mainly on the Indian subcontinent), saj (in Arabic), sac (in Turkish) and other variations and combinations thereof,  is a metal-made cooking utensil. The tawa is round and can be flat, but more commonly has a curved profile, and while the concave side can be used as a wok or frying pan, the convex side is used for cooking flatbreads and pancakes.

The Indian tawa might have a handle or not, and it can be made of cast iron or aluminium, or of carbon steel. The utensil may be enameled or given a non-stick surface. The tawa and saj are used in the cuisines of South, Central, and West Asia, as well as of the Caucasus and the Balkans. The tawa is also used in Indo-Caribbean cuisine.

Names by region

Taaba, Tava, tawa
In Iran the Persian word tāve is used which is derived from Persian word taaba which means something that is curved or tempered. The root word taab in Persian is a verb which means to bend or temper or curve (but see here-below for the use of saj in Iran). It is cognate with tawaa, a word which in nearly all Indo-Aryan languages such as Punjabi, Hindi and Urdu means cooking pan. In Afghanistan the curved cast-iron utensil used for cooking bread is known as tawah, but in Pashto it is more popularly known as tabakhey. The Georgian cognate is tapa.

Saj, saç
Saj (lit. sheet-metal) is the equivalent of tava in Arabic, with the equivalent saç or sac in Turkish, and is used in Southwest Asia. In Iran saj is used for the curved iron plate employed in cooking bread (but see here-above for the use of tāve in Iran).

Variants, change of meaning
The word tava is also used in Turkish and all across the Balkans, and refers to any kind of frying pan. In Serbia and Bulgaria however, a тава (tava) is a metal baking tray with raised margins (for the meaning of sach in those same countries, see here-below). In Romanian too, tava can mean baking tray, such as are employed for baking in an oven, but it can also mean tray, such as used for serving food and drink.

The sač is a saj-shaped lid used as a cooking utensil in the Balkans. In Serbia and Bulgaria, the flat ceramic сач (sach) or сачѐ (sachè) is used for table-top cooking of thin slices of vegetables and meat (for the meaning of tava in those same countries, see here-above).

Uses
A tava or saj is used to bake a variety of leavened and unleavened flatbreads and pancakes across the broad region: pita, naan, saj bread, roti, chapati, paratha, dosa, and pesarattu. In Pakistan, especially in rural areas, large convex saj are used to cook several breads at the same time or to make rumali roti.

See also
 Comal (cookware), a similar utensil in Mexican cuisine
 Karahi, a similar utensil in Indian cuisine
 Wok, a similar utensil in East Asian cuisine
 Mittad
 Mongolian barbecue, a Taiwanese grill dish sometimes using a saj-like frying pan
 List of cooking vessels

References

Sources

  

Cooking vessels
Pancakes
Middle Eastern cuisine
South Asian cuisine
Central Asian cuisine
Pakistani food preparation utensils
Indian food preparation utensils
Bangladeshi food preparation utensils